Yuri Vasiliev is a Russian professional basketball player. He currently plays with the pro club Dynamo Moscow.

Russian national team
Vasiliev has also been a member of the senior Russian national basketball team.

External links
Eurocup Profile

Year of birth missing (living people)
Living people
Russian men's basketball players
BC Dynamo Moscow players
21st-century Russian people
Place of birth missing (living people)